Indio Hills is a census-designated place in Riverside County, California. The 2010 United States census reported Indio Hills's population was 972.

Geography
According to the United States Census Bureau, the CDP covers an area of 21.5 square miles (55.7 km), all of it land.

Demographics

At the 2010 census Indio Hills had a population of 972. The racial makeup of Indio Hills was 542 (55.8%) White, 6 (0.6%) African American, 15 (1.5%) Native American, 5 (0.5%) Asian, 1 (0.1%) Pacific Islander, 391 (40.2%) from other races, and 12 (1.2%) from two or more races. Hispanic or Latino of any race were 657 people (67.6%).

The whole population lived in households, no one lived in non-institutionalized group quarters and no one was institutionalized.

There were 304 households, 117 (38.5%) had children under the age of 18 living in them, 160 (52.6%) were opposite-sex married couples living together, 18 (5.9%) had a female householder with no husband present, 37 (12.2%) had a male householder with no wife present.  There were 14 (4.6%) unmarried opposite-sex partnerships, and 4 (1.3%) same-sex married couples or partnerships. 74 households (24.3%) were one person and 20 (6.6%) had someone living alone who was 65 or older. The average household size was 3.20.  There were 215 families (70.7% of households); the average family size was 3.91.

The age distribution was 257 people (26.4%) under the age of 18, 90 people (9.3%) aged 18 to 24, 257 people (26.4%) aged 25 to 44, 283 people (29.1%) aged 45 to 64, and 85 people (8.7%) who were 65 or older.  The median age was 34.4 years. For every 100 females, there were 114.6 males.  For every 100 females age 18 and over, there were 123.4 males.
There were 358 housing units at an average density of 16.6 per square mile, of the occupied units 246 (80.9%) were owner-occupied and 58 (19.1%) were rented. The homeowner vacancy rate was 3.5%; the rental vacancy rate was 14.7%.  809 people (83.2% of the population) lived in owner-occupied housing units and 163 people (16.8%) lived in rental housing units.

References

Census-designated places in Riverside County, California
Census-designated places in California
Coachella Valley